Ève Lavallière (born Eugénie Marie Pascaline Fenoglio, 1 April 1866 – 10 July 1929) was a French stage actress and later a noteworthy Catholic penitent and member of the Secular Franciscan Order.

Biography 
Ève Lavallière was born at 8 rue Champ-de-Mars in Toulon. She was the daughter of Louis-Emile Fenoglio, a tailor of Neapolitan origin, and Albania-Marie Rana, who was born in Perpignan. At birth, her parents already had a son. Her birth was not desired, and she was placed, up to school age, with a local family of peasants. At school age, however, she was enrolled by her parents in a private school of excellent reputation. After the death of her parents in tragic circumstances and running away from home she arrived in Paris as a teenager.
She became an  actress renowned in the Belle Époque, including the Théâtre des Variétés in Paris.
 
From 1917, she moved to the castle of Choisille, at Chanceaux-sur-Choisille, Indre-et-Loire (later occupied by the Pinder circus). She had a radical religious conversion and became a devout Catholic. She wished to join a religious order and for a time was a medical missionary in Tunisia. She became a Franciscan tertiary, a member of the Secular Franciscans or Third Order of St Francis. 
 
She is buried in Thuillières where she died in 1929.

Theater 
Her most famous roles were in the following:

 1892 : La Vie parisienne by Jacques Offenbach, Henri Meilhac, Ludovic Halévy, Théâtre des Variétés,
 1896 : Le Carillon by Ernest Blum and Paul Ferrier, Théâtre des Variétés
 1897 : Paris qui Marche, a review by Hector Monréal and Henri Blondeau, Théâtre des Variétés
 1898 : Les Petites Barnett by Paul Gavault and Louis Varney, Théâtre des Variétés
 1899 : La Belle Hélène by Jacques Offenbach, booklet by Henri Meilhac and Ludovic Halévy, Théâtre des Variétés
 1900 : Mademoiselle George by Victor de Cottens and Pierre Veber, music by Louis Vernet, Théâtre des Variétés
 1901 : La Veine by Alfred Capus, Théâtre des Variétés
 1902 : Les Deux Écoles by Alfred Capus, Théâtre des Variétés
 1903 : Le Sire de Vergy by Gaston Arman de Caillavet, Théâtre des Variétés
 1903 : Paris aux Variétés, revue by Paul Gavault, Théâtre des Variétés
 1904 : La Boule by Henri Meilhac and Ludovic Halévy, Théâtre des Variétés
 1904 : Monsieur de la Palisse by Robert de Flers and Gaston Arman de Caillavet, music by Claude Terrasse, Théâtre des Variétés
 1904 : Die Fledermaus as La Chauve-Souris (Prince Orlofsky), words by Henri Meilhac and Ludovic Halevy, music by Johann Strauss
 1904 : Barbe-bleue by Jacques Offenbach, libretto by Henri Meilhac and Ludovic Halévy, Théâtre des Variétés
 1905 : L'Âge d'Or by Georges Feydeau and Maurice Desvallières, Théâtre des Variétés
 1905 : Miss Helyett, an opérette in 3 acts, text by Maxime Boucheron, music by Edmond Audran, Théâtre des Variétés
 1905 : La Petite Bohême, an opera in 3 acts, text by Paul Ferrier after Henry Murger, music by Henri Hirchmann, Théâtre des Variétés
 1906 : Miquette et sa mère by Robert de Flers and Gaston Arman de Caillavet, Théâtre des Variétés
 1908 : Le Roi by Robert de Flers, Gaston Arman de Caillavet, Emmanuel Arène, Théâtre des Variétés
 1908 : L'Oiseau blessé by Alfred Capus, Théâtre de la Renaissance
 1909 : Un ange by Alfred Capus, Théâtre des Variétés
 1910 : Le Bois sacré by Robert de Flers and Gaston Arman de Caillavet, Théâtre des Variétés
 1911 : Les Favorites by Alfred Capus, Théâtre des Variétés
 1912 : Les Petits by Lucien Népoty, Théâtre Antoine
 1913 : La Dame de chez Maxim by Georges Feydeau, Théâtre des Variétés
 1913 : Le Tango, a work of Jean Richepin, Théâtre de l'Athénée
 1914 : Ma tante d'Honfleur by Paul Gavault, Théâtre des Variétés

References
 (Spanish) Omer Englebert, "Vida y conversion de Eva Lavallière", Mundo Moderno, Biografías y Memorias, Buenos Aires, 1953
 (Spanish) José María Hernández Gamell, "Una mujer extraordinaria. Vida y conversion de la famosa artista de Paris, Eva Lavallière". Ed. Caballeros Comendadores de Santa Teresita del Niño Jesús y de la Santa Faz, Madrid, 1944; reissue, Afrodisio Aguado, Madrid, 1945
 (French) Jean-Paul Claudel, Ève Lavallière : Orpheline de la terre ("Ève Lavallière: orphan of the Earth"), Gérard Louis Editor, 2007 
  (English)  L.L. McReavy A Modern Magdalen, Eva Lavalliere (1866-1929) (1934)
  (English) Charlotte Kelly,  A Saint of the Stage - Eve Lavalliere Australian Catholic Truth Society No. 775 (1947) http://www.pamphlets.org.au/cts-pamphlets/9-austraila/738-a-saint-of-the-stage-eve-lavalliere.html

External links 
 Ève Lavallière on data.bnf.fr
 Quelques mots sur Ève Lavallière
 Le séjour en Tunisie d'Ève Lavallière
 La tombe d'Ève Lavallière à Thuillières
 Profile, michaeljournal.org
 Profile, catholicireland.net
 Profile, todayscatholicworld.com

19th-century French actresses
French stage actresses
Actors from Toulon
1866 births
1929 deaths
20th-century French nuns
20th-century French actresses
Belle Époque